Alexa Guarachi and Desirae Krawczyk were the defending champions, but Krawczyk chose not to participate. Guarachi played alongside Erin Routliffe, but lost in the first round to Cornelia Lister and Renata Voráčová.

Anastasia Potapova and Yana Sizikova won the title, defeating Monique Adamczak and Han Xinyun in the final, 6–2, 6–4.

Seeds

Draw

Draw

References

External Links 
Main Draw

Ladies Open Lausanne - Doubles
WTA Swiss Open